Belser is a surname, and may refer to:

 Caesar Edward Belser, American football player
 James Edwin Belser (1800–1854), American politician
 Jason Belser, American football player
 W. Gordon Belser Arboretum (or Belser Arboretum; named after W. Gordon Belser)
 William Belser Spong Jr., (1920-1997), Senator of Virginia

See also 
 Belzer - disambiguation page
 Beltzer - disambiguation page